A closet is a small, enclosed storage space, often used for clothes. Historically, the term referred to a small private room in a large house.

Closet may also refer to:
Various forms of toilet, notably:
 Water closet (W.C.), another term for a flush toilet
Earth closet, one type of dry toilet
Pail closet, several types of dry toilet
 Closet drama, a play intended for reading rather than performing
 Closet Cases of the Nerd Kind, 1980 spoof film
 ""Closet Clown / Seat to Stardom", an episode of Rocko's Modern Life
 Closet (film), a South Korean film
 Closet (album), a 2022 album by Yoh Kamiyama

See also
The Closet (disambiguation)
In the closet (disambiguation)
Coming out (of the closet), is a figure of speech for lesbian, gay, bisexual, and transgender (LGBT) people's disclosure of their sexual orientation or gender identity
Passing (sociology), a more general description of hiding one's identity
Skeleton in the closet (idiom), phrase describing any undisclosed personal fact
Closet narcissism, narcissism with a deflated, inadequate self-perception
Cabinet (room)